The Olympus Stylus Epic, also known as the μ[mju:]-II in other parts of the world, is a 35mm compact camera. Introduced in 1997, the Olympus Stylus Epic followed a long line of fixed focal length, budget priced, consumer level, point and shoot cameras from Olympus that have tended to appeal to enthusiasts and professionals who want a camera small enough to fit in a pocket. It is much cheaper than most point and shoot cameras that are popular with enthusiasts.

It has a spot meter, and optional red eye reduction. The design is very tough and the camera can be carried in a pocket or handbag without fear of damage. The camera is also very lightweight  and splash proof.

The fixed lens on this camera is much faster than other Olympus point-and-shoots many of which include zoom lenses. The zoom lens versions have much slower lenses (f/4.5 at the wide end), and in general, lower quality optics, compared to the fixed 35mm lens.

The "active three spot" automatic exposure system on this camera is quite sophisticated for a point and shoot. It can handle situations that would deter most point-and-shoots, like focusing properly when aimed at two people, where there is a space between the subjects. Most cameras would focus on the center item (infinity), and the subjects would end up out of focus. The μ-II handles this situation with ease. You can also set the flash to fire regardless of the level of ambient light to provide "fill flash" functionality.

The automatic exposure tends to favour more wide open exposure. Nevertheless, the lens center is sharp even wide open, though the corners are soft. There is a fair amount of vignetting, wide open. Red-eye can be a problem, with the flash so close to the lens. Red eye reduction is available, but this slows down the shot.

The camera moves the lens after the shutter is depressed, which results in a small (0.25 second) delay. The lens can be pre-focused, but it still doesn't move into position until the shutter button is fully depressed. It is pretty standard behavior in film point and shoot cameras.

The flash starts charging when the cover is opened rather than when the shutter button is partially depressed. It makes the camera much more "ready" for the shot, unless you pre-focus by half-depressing the shutter, compared to most digital points and shoots, most of which don't start charging the flash until the shutter button is depressed.

The Stylus Epic is somewhat of a cult classic among avid photographers due to the quality and speed of the lens, a rare attribute among compact cameras.

It only has four DX-code reading contacts instead of the normal six, limiting the available ISO settings to complete stops, i.e., 100, 200, 400, 800, 1600, and 3200.

Flash modes
It has the following flash modes:
Automatic
Red eye reduction - this camera uses a series of low power pre-flashes rather than a separate bulb
Flash off - This will cause the camera to automatically use a slower shutter speed necessitating the use of a tripod or similar
Fill-in flash
Night scene flash - This also uses a slow shutter speed and is incompatible with spot-metering mode
Red eye reduction night scene flash

References

External links 
 Olympus Stylus Epic Reviews - PhotographyREVIEW.com
 Olympus MJII Review - photo.net
 Olympus Stylus Epic(mju II)

Point-and-shoot cameras
Stylus Epic